Sara Hjalmarsson (born 9 February 1998) is a Swedish ice hockey player and member of the Swedish national team, currently playing with the Providence Friars women's ice hockey program in the Hockey East (WHEA) conference of the NCAA Division I.

She represented Sweden in the women's ice hockey tournament at the 2018 Winter Olympics in PyeongChang, the women's ice hockey tournament at the 2022 Winter Olympics in Beijing, and at the IIHF Women's World Championships in 2017, 2019, and 2022.

Playing career 
Hjalmarssom hails from Bankeryd, Sweden and attended Solna Gymnasium for secondary school. She played with HV71 Dam during 2012 to 2014 and in the Swedish Women's Hockey League (SDHL; called Riksserien until 2016) with AIK Hockey Dam during 2014 to 2018.

NCAA 
As a forward with the Friars, she scored 17 goals, and 11 assists in the 2019–20 season, to lead the team in goals scored and tie for points. She was named the Hockey East Player of the Week on 2 December 2019, for having scored six points in the Friar's Mayor's Cup game against Brown Bears, the most points in a game by any NCAA player to that point in the season.

Awards and honors
2020–21 Hockey East Second Team All-Star

References

External links

1998 births
Living people
AIK Hockey Dam players
HV71 Dam players
Ice hockey players at the 2018 Winter Olympics
Ice hockey players at the 2022 Winter Olympics
Olympic ice hockey players of Sweden
People from Jönköping Municipality
Providence Friars women's ice hockey players
Sportspeople from Jönköping County
Swedish expatriate ice hockey players in the United States
Swedish women's ice hockey forwards